The Institute of Certified Public Accountants of Uganda (ICPA Uganda) is a professional body for certified public accountants (CPAs) in Uganda. As of July 2016, total membership was about 2,000 members.

Location 
ICPA Uganda maintains its headquarters at 42 Bukoto Street, on Kololo Hill in Kampala, the capital and largest city of Uganda. The coordinates of the institute's headquarters are 0°20'27.0"N,  32°35'20.0"E (Latitude:0.340833; Longitude:32.588889).

History
Institute of Certified Public Accountants of Uganda, ICPAU, was established in 1992 by an act of parliament. The first five-member governing council was appointed by the minister of finance in 1993. The first duly elected seven-person council was installed on 8 November 1994 for a three-year renewable term.

Overview
ICPAU is a national professional accountancy organization established to regulate and maintain the standard of accountancy in Uganda. It is also mandated to regulate the conduct of all professional accountants in the country. The members of this organization are employed in public service, private enterprise, government, education, industry, and commerce. In collaboration with the Uganda National Examinations Board (UNEB), the institute organises and administers the professional competency examinations that lead to the recognition of an accountant as a CPA in Uganda.

Governing council
The eleven-person governing council is chaired by ICPA Uganda's president, CPA Constant Othieno Mayende, deputized by CPA Josephine Okui Okwakol Ossiya, the second woman to serve in that capacity since the institute was founded in 1992.

The secretariat
The secretariat is headed by the chief executive officer, Derick Nkajja, who also serves as the secretary to the governing council. He is assisted by three directors, in the following areas: (a) Director of Examinations (b) Director of Corporate Services (c) Director of Standards and Regulations

The Current Director of Education is Mr John Bosco Ntangaare, Director of Corporate Services is CPA Simon Oola, The Director of Standards & Regulations is CPA Mark Omona

International affiliations
ICPAU has been a member of the International Federation of Accountants (IFAC) since 1997.

References

External links
 Take charge of your industry, accountants tell Central Bank
 Institute of Certified Public Accountants in Uganda
 Website of Uganda National Examinations Board
 ICPAU Management Team

Organizations established in 1992
Professional associations based in Uganda
1992 establishments in Uganda
Member bodies of the International Federation of Accountants
Accounting in Uganda
Organisations based in Kampala
Kampala Central Division